Heather Gustafson is an American politician representing District 36 in the Minnesota Senate since 2023. 

A member of the Democratic–Farmer–Labor Party, Gustafson lives in Vadnais Heights, Minnesota. She is a former radio broadcaster and high school history teacher. In the 2022 Minnesota Senate election, she campaigned on increasing funding for police and public safety, protecting abortion access, and eliminating a state tax on Social Security benefits. She defeated incumbent Republican Roger Chamberlain to represent a newly redrawn District 36. Gustafson supports the legalization of recreational marijuana and some red flag laws.

Electoral history

References 

Living people
Year of birth missing (living people)
Place of birth missing (living people)
Democratic Party Minnesota state senators
Women state legislators in Minnesota
21st-century American women educators
21st-century American educators
21st-century American women politicians
Schoolteachers from Minnesota
American radio people
People from Vadnais Heights, Minnesota